The 1993 Open Championship was a men's major golf championship and the 122nd Open Championship, held from 15–18 July at Royal St George's Golf Club in Sandwich, England. Greg Norman shot a final round 64 (–6) to win his second Open Championship, two strokes ahead of runner-up Nick Faldo.

Course layout
Royal St George's Golf Club

Lengths of the course for previous Opens (since 1950):
 1985: , par 70
 1981: , par 70

Past champions in the field

Made the cut

Missed the cut

Round summaries

First round
Thursday, 15 July 1993

Second round
Friday, 16 July 1993

Amateurs: Pyman (E), Leonard (+8), Welch (+8), Dundas (+13), Voges (+15), Griffiths (+18).

Third round
Saturday, 17 July 1993

Final round
Sunday, 18 July 1993

Amateurs: Pyman (+1)
Source:

References

External links
Royal St George's 1993 (Official site)
122nd Open Championship - Royal St George's (European Tour)
1993 Open Championship (GolfCompendium.com)

The Open Championship
Golf tournaments in England
Open Championship
Open Championship
Open Championship